Vavilov is a prominent impact crater that is located to the west of the walled plain Hertzsprung. It is located on the far side of the Moon and cannot be viewed directly from the Earth. About a crater diameter to the northwest is the smaller Chaucer, and farther to the southwest is Sechenov.

This is a relatively young impact that still retains the faint remnants of a ray system. Just outside the rim is a shadowed area, with the rays beginning about one-third of a crater diameter distant. The faint rays extend for several crater diameters in all directions.

Vavilov is a well-defined feature that has undergone a minimum of erosion due to subsequent impacts. The outer rim is roughly circular, with a pair of slight outward bulges to the southeast. The inner walls of the rim display several terraces, particularly to the southeast. The interior floor is roughly level, with a central ridge offset to the west of the midpoint, and some low hills in the southeast.  The area to the west on the outer rim are some of the highest areas near the equator on the Moon.

Satellite craters 

By convention these features are identified on lunar maps by placing the letter on the side of the crater midpoint that is closest to Vavilov.

See also 
 2862 Vavilov, asteroid

References

 
 
 
 
 
 
 
 
 
 
 
 

Impact craters on the Moon